On 30 November 1975, USM Alger faced ASM Oran in a Nationale I fixture at Stade 5 Juillet 1962, during the 1975–76 season. ASM Oran were newly promoted to the National II. USM Alger won the match 11–0, recording their biggest ever top-flight win, and inflicting ASM Oran's heaviest ever defeat. five different players scored for USM Alger, Including five goals by Djamel Zidane.

Match
In the 12th round of the Nationale I, Zidane opened the scoring in the 4th minute, ten minutes later added Hocine Rabet scoring the second goal six minutes later Khelifa Benmessaoud added the third goal after that in the 25 minutes – added Déraoul fourth goal and four minutes later Zidane returned again scored the fifth goal to end the first half 5–0. In the second half, Zidane scored again two goals in two minutes later in the 73rd minute – Déraoul scored his second and eighth in the throw, after ten minutes Benmessaoud scored his second goal, three minutes later Zidane scored the fifth goal and the last goals in the games for him at the age of twenty only, in the last minute of the match, substitute player Nacer Guedioura scored the 11th goal. This is the heaviest result at the Stade 5 Juillet 1962 since its opening so far in all competitions.

Match details

See also
 1975–76 Algerian Championnat National
 1975–76 Algerian Cup

References

1975–76 in Algerian football
ASM Oran 1975
November 1975 sports events in Africa
Record association football wins